R.J. Nuevas (also credited as Robert Joseph Nuevas) is a Filipino television writer and film writer. He is a resident writer of GMA Network, for which he created the graphic novel-themed series Impostora.

He has adapted, for television, three of Carlo J. Caparas' graphic novels: Bakekang in 2006, Kamandag in 2007 and Ang Babaeng Hinugot sa Aking Tadyang in 2009. He is also writing the screenplay for the big-budget movie adaptation of Caparas' most famous work, Ang Panday.

Filmography

Television
 2022 Maria Clara at Ibarra (creator)
 2021 Heartful Café (creator, head writer)
 2021 Babawiin Ko ang Lahat (creator)
 2018 Ika-5 Utos (as head writer)
 2018 Sherlock Jr. (as head writer)
 2017 Impostora (creator, head writer)
 2016 Ika-6 na Utos (creator, head writer)
 2016 Hahamakin ang Lahat (creator, head writer)
 2016 Once Again (as head writer)
 2015 Buena Familia (creator)
 2014 Innamorata (creator, head writer)
 2013 Villa Quintana (creator, head writer)
 2013 Genesis (creator, head writer)
 2013 Anna Karenina (creator, head writer)
 2013 Home Sweet Home (creator, head writer) 
 2013 Love and Lies (creator)     
 2013 Mundo Mo'y Akin (creator)    
 2013 Bukod Kang Pinagpala (creator, head writer)
 2012 Magdalena (creator)
 2012 Sana Ay Ikaw Na Nga (creator, head writer)
 2012 Faithfully (creator, head writer)
 2011 Sinner or Saint (creator)
 2009 Rosalinda (as head writer)
 2009 Ang Babaeng Hinugot Sa Aking Tadyang (as head writer)
 2008 Luna Mystica (as head writer)
 2008 Codename: Asero (as head writer, creator)
 2007 Kamandag (as head writer)
 2007 La Vendetta (as head writer)
 2007 Impostora (as head writer, creator)
 2006 Bakekang (as head writer)
 2006 Majika (as head writer)
 2006 Sugo (as head writer)
 2004 Ikaw Sa Puso Ko (as writer)
 2000 May Bukas Pa (as headwriter)
 1998 Halik Sa Apoy (as developer)
 1998 Ganyan Kita Kamahal (as developer)
 1997 Ikaw Na Sana (as developer)
 1996 Mukha ng Buhay (as writer)
 1996 Anna Karenina (as writer)
 1995 Villa Quintana (as writer)

Film 

 2010 Si Agimat at si Enteng Kabisote (story and screenplay)
2009 Ang Panday (screenplay)
2008 Dobol Trobol (screenplay)
2007 Bahay Kubo (scrsenplay)
2006 I Will Always Love You (story and screenplay)
2005 Say That You Love Me (screenplay)
2005 Let the Love Begin (screenplay)
2004 Lastikman: Unang Banat (story)
2004 Annie B. (screenplay)
2003 Captain Barbell (story and screenplay)
1997 Wala Na Bang Iba (story and screenplay)
1992 Ngayon At Kailan Man (screenplay)

External links
 

Filipino dramatists and playwrights
Living people
Year of birth missing (living people)
Filipino screenwriters
GMA Network (company) people